The women's pole vault event at the 2011 Summer Universiade was held on 17–19 August.

Medalists

Results

Qualification
Qualification: 4.15 m (Q) or at least 12 best (q) qualified for the final.

Final

References
Qualification Group A results
Qualification Group B results
Final results

Pole
2011 in women's athletics
2011